I Never Felt Nun is the debut studio album by American rapper EST Gee. It was released through Interscope Records, Collective Music Group, and Warlike on September 16, 2022. The album features guest appearances from Future, Jack Harlow, Bryson Tiller, Machine Gun Kelly, and Jeezy.

Background
The day the album was released, EST Gee spoke about it in an interview with Apple Music DJ Zane Lowe:I don't want to put my beliefs, my feelings off on other people, but just, you got to stay motivated. 'Cause a lot of time it don't seem like it get better. You know what I'm saying? But you got to make it better. So that feeling of not feeling nothing... You know what I'm saying? That shit's basically just keep going through it, don't let it affect you. Before I knew to tell myself, that's how I really was. You know what I'm saying? So that's just what that album's about.

Release and promotion
On September 6, 2022, EST Gee announced the album along with its title and release date. The next day, he revealed the tracklist, which had all the featured artists unannounced. The day after that, the features were announced in a new format of the tracklist that he posted in collaboration with Spotify hip hop playlist RapCaviar.

Singles
The lead single of the album, "Blood", was released on July 29, 2022. It was followed up with the second single, "Love Is Blind", which was released on August 12, 2022. The third single, "Hell", was released on September 1, 2022. The fourth single, "Shoot It Myself", which features fellow American rapper Future, was released on September 9, 2022. The fifth and final single, "Backstage Passes", which features fellow American rapper Jack Harlow, was sent to US rhythmic contemporary radio on October 11, 2022.

Critical reception

I Never Felt Nun received generally positive reviews from music critics. AllMusic wrote, "Louisville rapper EST Gee brings his imposing presence, trauma-fixated lyricism, and deft ability to navigate a hard beat to his debut studio album." Nadine Smith of Pitchfork wrote, "Though rap has reached vast new emotional depths in the last decade, Gee's confessionals are still startling in how bluntly they address the demons head-on. EST Gee's lyricism doesn't bring the catharsis of a therapy session or the removed vantage point of hindsight; I Never Felt Nun comes straight from the heart, hardened like armor." Paul Attard of Slant was slightly more mixed, writing, "The title of Gee's first studio album indicates his continuing disassociation from his emotions."

Track listing

Charts

References

2022 debut albums
EST Gee albums
Interscope Records albums
Collective Music Group albums